Clingmans Dome is a mountain in the Great Smoky Mountains of Tennessee and North Carolina in the southeastern United States. Its name in Cherokee is Kuwahi or Kuwohi (ᎫᏩᎯ or ᎫᏬᎯ), meaning "mulberry place." It is also the third highest point in mainland Eastern North America, after Mount Mitchell and Mount Craig.

Description
Clingmans Dome has two subpeaks:  Mount Buckley to the west and  Mount Love to the east. The headwaters of several substantial streams are located on the slopes of Clingmans Dome, namely Little River on the north slope, and Forney Creek and Noland Creek (both tributaries of the Tuckasegee River) on the south slope. The mountain is located entirely within the watershed of the Tennessee River.

Clingmans Dome is protected as part of the Great Smoky Mountains National Park. The  concrete observation tower, built in 1959 and listed on the National Register of Historic Places, offers a panoramic view of the mountains. An air quality monitoring station, operated by the Environmental Protection Agency, is the second highest in eastern North America.

The Southern Appalachian spruce-fir forest which covers Clingmans Dome occurs only at the highest elevations in the southeastern United States, and has more in common with forests at northern latitudes than with the forests in the adjacent valleys. The forest on and around Clingmans Dome has experienced a large die-off of Fraser fir caused by the non-native insect, balsam woolly adelgid.

Observation tower

Built in 1959, the  concrete observation tower features a circular observation platform accessed by a spiral ramp. The platform,  in diameter, allows spectators a 360-degree panorama of the surrounding terrain. Cantilevered signs point out the various peaks, ridges, cities, and other features visible in the distance.

The tower was one of nine observation towers constructed as part of the Mission 66 program (1955–1966), an effort by the National Park Service to upgrade its facilities to accommodate an influx of visitors to national parks during the post-World War II era. Designed by Hubert Bebb of the Gatlinburg-based architecture firm Bebb and Olson, the tower's modern design, especially the use of concrete as the primary building material, marked a departure from previous park structures, which favored more rustic elements. Though some criticized the Clingmans Dome tower as too "urban," two other park service observation towers— the nearby Look Rock tower along Foothills Parkway and the Shark Valley tower at Everglades National Park— were built using similar designs.

Bebb's original design consisted of a massive stone tower topped by a circular platform and fire observation cab, and accessed by a concrete ramp. Fred Arnold, head of the park service's Forest and Wildlife Protection branch, rejected the inclusion of the fire observation cab, arguing that while Clingmans Dome was the highest point in the park, it wasn't particularly useful for fire detection purposes. Park service director Conrad Wirth objected to the use of a ramp, favoring instead a spiral staircase. After John B. Cabot, head of the park service's Eastern Office of Design and Construction, convinced him of the ramp's usefulness, Wirth decided the stone tower would not be necessary, stating a single central support column would suffice.

The tower was built by the Waynesville-based construction firm of W.C. Norris at a cost of $57,000. Ground was broken in December 1958. After several weather delays, and a great deal of controversy over the aesthetics of the design, the tower was completed on October 23, 1959.

Access

Clingmans Dome is the most accessible mountain top in the Great Smoky Mountains National Park. A  paved trail leads from the parking lot to the  observation tower at the top of the mountain. The short, steep trail provides a small visitor information center and park store staffed by the Great Smoky Mountains Association, garbage cans, and numerous benches to the side of the path. Vault toilet restrooms are available. The trail offers a glimpse of the often hostile environment of highland Appalachia, passing through the spruce-fir forest and its accompanying blowdowns and dead Fraser Firs.

The Appalachian Trail (A.T.) crosses Clingmans Dome, passing immediately north of the observation tower. A  leg of the trail connects the mountain with Newfound Gap, and provides the only access to the mountain in winter months. Clingmans Dome is the upper terminus for several additional hiking trails, including the Forney Ridge Trail (to Andrews Bald) and the Forney Creek Trail (to the Benton MacKaye Trail on the shores of Fontana Lake).

The western terminus of the Mountains-to-Sea Trail, which connects the Smokies to the Outer Banks of North Carolina, is located atop Clingmans Dome.

History
The Cherokee name for Clingmans Dome is Kuwahi or Kuwohi (ᎫᏩᎯ), or "mulberry place." According to a Cherokee myth recorded by ethnologist James Mooney in the late 19th century, the mountain was the home of the White Bear, the great chief of all bears, and the location of one of the bears' councilhouses. The enchanted lake of Ataga'hi ("Gall Place"), the waters of which could cure wounded bears, was believed by the Cherokee to be located somewhere between Clingmans Dome and the headwaters of the Oconaluftee River to the east.

In 1789, an act passed by the North Carolina legislature ceded what is now Tennessee to the federal government. This act fixed a portion of the boundary between the two along the crest of the "Great Iron or Smoky Mountains," which would have included the mountain now known as Clingmans Dome.

The mountain was dubbed "Smoky Dome" by American settlers moving in from other areas. In 1859, the mountain was renamed by Arnold Guyot for compatriot Thomas Lanier Clingman (1812–1897), a Confederate general of the American Civil War who explored the area extensively in the 1850s and then spent many years promoting it. Guyot named the mountain for Clingman because of an argument between Clingman and a professor at the University of North Carolina, Elisha Mitchell, over which mountain was actually the highest in the region. Mitchell contended that a peak by the name of Black Dome (now known as Mount Mitchell) was the highest, while Clingman asserted that Smoky Dome was the true highest peak. Guyot determined that Black Dome was  higher than Smoky Dome.

In the early morning hours of June 12, 1946, a Boeing B-29 Superfortress crashed near the summit of Clingmans Dome, killing all twelve aboard.

In June 2022, Lavita Hill and Mary "Missy" Crowe, both members of the Eastern Band of Cherokee Indians, drafted legislation for the Tribe to support changing the name of Clingman's Dome to Kuwahi ('mulberry place') - the original name given to the area by Cherokees.  The resolution describes the area, “Kuwahi or ‘mulberry place’, is the highest point in our area and has significance to us as Cherokees as it was visited by medicine people who prayed and sought guidance from the Creator regarding important matters facing our people, and then returned to our towns to give guidance and advice.”

The Tribal Council of the Eastern Band of Cherokee Indians passed the legislation, submitted by Hill and Crowe, during its regular session on July 14, 2022 - thus, lending the Tribe's support for the name change effort.  During the meeting, Crowe said the area has been there for Cherokee people for thousands of years.  “What we hope to do is to be able to come as a collective community group of elders to us…to our younger folks. We see this as an avenue for our younger generation to learn, to relearn – to relearn who and what we are as a people that Creator placed here.”  Hill commented, “It just feels good.  First of all, I’m very grateful for the support.  I’m grateful for Myrtle and Sally to talk about the language.  We’re going to move forward so that the mountain presently known as Clingman’s Dome is restored to its original name which we believe is ‘Kuwahi’.  Here’s our chance to honor our ancestors. Maybe we can’t take the land back, but we’re going to put the language out there and we’re going to put education out there and more people are going to know that this was Cherokee homeland. Let’s honor them. Let’s give them this name. Let’s respect them in that regard.”

The official process starts with the filing of an application for a name change through the United States Board on Geographic Names (BGN).

On August 2, 2022, the Buncombe County Board of Commissioners voted unanimously to support the name change, after consultation with the Eastern Band of Cherokee Indians.

Geology
Clingmans Dome is part of a geological formation known as the Copperhill Formation. It consists predominately of massive, coarse-grained metagreywacke and metaconglomerate. The Lower northern flanks of Clingmans Dome are underlain by thick layers of sulfidic, quartz-garnet-muscovite phyllite and schist, which occur within the metagraywackes and metaconglomerates. Adjacent to and south of its summit, thin, southward-dipping, and discontinuous beds of garnetiferous, locally graphitic and sulfidic, metasiltstone occur within the Copperhill Formation.

The Copperhill Formation is part of the greater Ocoee Supergroup, a body of clastic metasedimentary rocks formed 560 million years ago. They unconformably lie upon Precambrian granitic and gneissic rocks. The sediments that originally comprised the Ocoee Supergroup accumulated in a string of narrow, deep-water basins that stretched along the entire southern-central Appalachian margin from Tennessee, North Carolina, to Georgia. These basins were rift basins formed by the rifting of Rodinia.

The initial metamorphism of the Ocoee Supergroup occurred about 400 million years ago as the result of Ordovician-Silurian tectonism during the Taconic orogeny. Later, Devonian-Mississippian metamorphism of these strata occurred during the Acadian orogeny and additional Pennsylvanian to Permian alteration by retrograde metamorphism and deformation occurred during the Alleghanian orogeny. During the latest part of this orogeny, this segment of the Appalachian Mountains was formed by thrust faulting and folding that uplifted these strata as a series of complexly deformed thrust sheets. During the Mesozoic and Cenozoic, the gradual uplift and erosion of this part of the Appalachian Mountains has continued.

Although a dense forest understory covers most of the mountain, outcroppings of the Copperhill Formation can be found on Clingmans Dome at the Forney Ridge Parking Lot at the end of Clingmans Dome Road. This outcrop exposes massive metaconglomerate of the Copperhill Formation. These cobble-size concretions are readily eroded by weathering to leave rust-stained depressions or cavities in the metaconglomerate.

Soils of Clingmans Dome are mostly moderately deep to shallow, well drained dark brown loam or sandy loam of strong to extreme acidity; Breakneck and Pullback series are most common.

Climate
The climate of Clingmans Dome is hemiboreal (Köppen Dfb, Trewartha Dcb). As with much of the southern Blue Ridge, the area qualifies as part of the Appalachian Rainforest.

Gallery

See also

 List of mountains in North Carolina
 List of U.S. states by elevation

References

External links

Thornberry-Ehrlich, T (2008) Great Smoky Mountains National Park Geologic Resource Evaluation Report. Natural Resource Report NPS/NRPC/GRD/NRR—2008/048. National Park Service, Denver, Colorado. Retrieved 2013-7-28.
'My Smoky Mountain Guide: Clingman's Dome'

Great Smoky Mountains National Park
Mountains of North Carolina
Mountains of Tennessee
Mountains on the Appalachian Trail
Mountains of Great Smoky Mountains National Park
Southern Sixers
Highest points of United States national parks
Highest points of U.S. states
Natural history of the Great Smoky Mountains
Protected areas of Sevier County, Tennessee
Protected areas of Swain County, North Carolina
Religious places of the indigenous peoples of North America
Mountains of Swain County, North Carolina
Mountains of Sevier County, Tennessee
North American 2000 m summits
Buildings and structures on the National Register of Historic Places in North Carolina
Buildings and structures in Swain County, North Carolina
National Register of Historic Places in Swain County, North Carolina